Natalia Koch Rohde (born 1 August 1995) is a Danish badminton player.

Achievements

BWF International Challenge/Series 
Women's singles

  BWF International Challenge tournament
  BWF International Series tournament
  BWF Future Series tournament

Personal life 
She is in a relationship with Viktor Axelsen.

Natalia Koch Rohde gave birth to a first baby girl named Vega Rohde Axelsen on 15 October 2020. On 7 October 2022 she gave birth to her second baby girl named Aya Rohde Axelsen. Her father Henrik Rohde, who was headcoach of the winning Skovshoved team in the Danish league in 2017, is also helping with the coaching  of her husband Viktor Axelsen.

In August 2021 her husband Viktor Axelsen decided to leave the Danish national team in Copenhagen and move with the whole family from Denmark to live in Dubai. There he could train at the NAS Sports Complex (Nad Al Sheba Sports Complex).

References

External links 
 

1995 births
Living people
People from Gentofte Municipality
Sportspeople from the Capital Region of Denmark
Danish female badminton players
21st-century Danish women